Arc de Triomf is a Rodalies de Catalunya and Barcelona Metro interchange complex. It is named after the adjacent triumphal arch of the same name near which it is situated, in the Barcelona district of Eixample in Catalonia, Spain. The Barcelona Metro station is served by TMB-operated line L1.

The complex is located near Estació del Nord, Barcelona's main bus station.

Station layout
Rodalies de Catalunya railway station is located under Avinguda Vilanova between Passeig de San Joan and Nàpols street. It was opened in 1933 as a prolongation to the city center on Puigcerdà and Manresa lines which had its terminus station in Estació del Nord, situated near the current railway station. It has two groups of accesses, one in Passeig de Sant Joan and the other one in Nàpols street. The accesses to the platforms are equipped with fixed stairs and both go to the same hall, where there are ticket vending machines. The station is being remodeled to make it more accessible for disabled persons.

Accesses
 Avinguda Vilanova
 Carretera de Ribes
 Carrer Nàpols
 Passeig de Sant Joan

References

External links
 
 Barcelona Arc de Triomf listing at Rodalies de Catalunya website
 Arc de Triomf listing at TMB website
 Information and photos of the Rodalies and the Barcelona Metro station at trenscat.cat 

Railway stations in Spain opened in 1932
Barcelona Metro line 1 stations
Railway stations in Barcelona
Rodalies de Catalunya stations
Transport in Eixample
Railway stations located underground in Spain